Voynov or Voinov (Russian, Ukrainian or Bulgarian: Войнов or Воинов, from воин meaning warrior) is a Russian masculine surname, its feminine counterpart is Voynova or Voinova. Notable people with the surname include:
Aleksandr Voynov (born 1993), Russian football midfielder
Anastasia Voynova (born 1993), Russian track cyclist
Denis Voynov (born 1990), Russian footballer
Dimitrie Voinov (1867–1951), Romanian zoologist, histologist and cytologist
Iliya Voynov (born 1964), Bulgarian football winger
Lyuboslav Voynov (born 1992), Bulgarian football midfielder
Nicolae Voinov (1834-1899), Romanian politician 
Sergey Voynov (born 1977), Uzbekistani javelin thrower
Slava Voynov (born 1990), Russian ice hockey player
Vanya Voynova (1934–1993), Bulgarian basketball player
Voyn Voynov (born 1952), Bulgarian footballer and manager
Yuriy Voynov (1931–2003), Soviet footballer and manager

References

Bulgarian-language surnames
Russian-language surnames
Occupational surnames